Rud Ab (also Romanized as Rūd Āb) is a city and capital of Rud Ab District, in Sabzevar County, Razavi Khorasan Province, Iran. At the 2006 census, its population was 3,470, in 883 families.

References 

Populated places in Sabzevar County
Cities in Razavi Khorasan Province